Lev Aleksandrovich Mei ( (name sometimes transliterated as Lev Mey)) was a Russian dramatist and poet.

Biography
Mei was born on 13/25 February 1822, in Moscow. His father was a German officer who was wounded in the Battle of Borodino and died young. His mother was Russian. Mei completed his studies in Moscow in 1841 and served in the office of the Governor for 10 years. He became part of the "young editorial staff" of Mikhail Pogodin's Moskvityanin. For a time, he taught secondary school, but was forced to retire because of conflicts with his colleagues. He moved to Saint Petersburg, where he was active in literary endeavors. It was during this period that he contributed to the leading Russian magazines, including Biblioteka Dlya Chteniya, Otechestvennye Zapiski, Syn Otechestva, Russkoye Slovo, Russkiy Mir, and Svetoch.

Mei wrote the historical dramas, The Tsar's Bride (1849), Servilia (1854) and The Maid of Pskov (1859), all three of which the composer Rimsky-Korsakov later used as the basis for operas.

Mei lived a dissipated and bohemian life, with a great fondness for drink, which led to his untimely death on 16/28 May 1862.

References

Sources
 Golub, Spencer. 1998. "Russia and the Republics of the Former Soviet Union." In The Cambridge Guide to Theatre. Ed. Martin Banham. Cambridge: Cambridge UP. 948-956. .

External links
Lev Aleksandrovich Mey. Poems

Poets from the Russian Empire
Male writers from the Russian Empire
Russian male poets
Translators from the Russian Empire
1822 births
1862 deaths
Dramatists and playwrights from the Russian Empire
19th-century translators from the Russian Empire
Russian male dramatists and playwrights
19th-century poets from the Russian Empire
19th-century dramatists and playwrights from the Russian Empire
19th-century male writers from the Russian Empire